Mashtots Park Movement, also known as #SaveMashtotsPark and OccupyMashtots began as a sit-in on February 11, 2012 in Mashtots Park, Yerevan. The protest was initiated by "This City Belongs to Us" civic initiative, and grew into a full-scale movement. The main issues were illegal or inadequate constructions, the destruction of trees and green zones in Yerevan, but now the questions of citizens' self-determination, fight against corruption and oligarchy, the prevalence of public interests over private have been raised. While the US occupy movements act against the bureaucratic system resulting in social and economic inequality, Mashtots Park Movement places itself in a different socioeconomic context - oligarchy, "people above the law" who, having economical and political resources, place their interests above those of the people.

The beginning of the movement

Background
Mashtots Park Movement's roots are in eco-activist movements of late 2000s in Armenia, when civic initiatives were formed to protect several endangered aspects of Armenian nature - including Teghut forest, Trchkan waterfall, Kajaran, and others; and the urban initiatives of Yerevan fighting for the preservation of the gardens, monuments, historical buildings and green zones.

Compensation for kiosks on Abovyan street
On January 18, 2011 Yerevan authorities began dismantling trade kiosks placed on downtown Abovyan Street. It was reported that as the kiosk owners had lease contracts and had made no breaches, the municipality had reached an agreement with them on the conditions of the dismantling - specifically, an agreement to compensate the dismantled kiosks by providing new ones on a new location.
While Yerevan Chief Architect Narek Sargsyan denied the rumors that the dismantled kiosks were to be moved to Aram Street, the municipality confirmed the news on January 30, 2011. Urban activists had staged a protest against the destruction of the green zone (later named Missak Manouchian Park) on the crossing of Mashtots Avenue and Aram Street in the center of Yerevan right besides Margaryan Maternity Hospital the previous day - January 29. Photographs show that the kiosk carcasses had already been assembled by that point - indicating an earlier date of construction.

Activist reaction

Mashtots Park Movement was initiated by civic activists trying to save the park from being turned into a trade zone with kiosks. The area was quickly dubbed "Mashtots park", a name it is known to the public now. Starting from February 11, 2012, when the activists were denied legal explanation for the construction, dozens of them organized a sit-in to halt the construction and save the park.
A group of doctors from the nearby Polyclinic No. 2 and Yerevan State Medical University disapproved of the construction and its effects on the overall city health.
Activists started a petition to voice the public opinion and influence the city mayor Taron Margaryan. Some 10,000 people signed the petition.

Escalation

First escalation: February 16–17
In the morning of February 16, day 6 of the sit-in the protesters set a polyethylene cover on the kiosk carcass they were occupying to protect themselves from the abundant snow, and were approached by three civilians, presumably - associated with the construction, demanding to take the cover off.

Through the mediation of the RA Ombudsman's Office the cover remained intact.
Soon a concrete-mixing vehicle tried to enter Mashtots park to deliver concrete to the construction site. About 40 activists blocked the way of the truck to prevent it from reaching its destination, and the truck had to return because the concrete had become useless in the cold.

The police threatened to disperse the protest for violating public order, while the Ombudsman Office of Armenia interfered and argued that the peaceful protest did not violate public order.

The next day the police made an attempt to disperse the picket by forcefully evicting the protestors from the kiosk they were occupying and surrounded the construction site, blocking protesters' and reporters' entrance.
The concrete-mixing vehicle returned later - only to face some 100 protesters, some of which lay in front of the truck to block its movement.
The activists were told by Deputy Head of Yerevan Police Robert Melkonyan that a municipality representative would arrive at the park at 4PM to negotiate with them.

The activists' hopes put on the Municipality weren't justified either: as agreed, the response concerning the ongoing situation should have been received from the municipality. At 4PM no municipality officials appeared at the park. Instead, the Art Manager of the Yerevan Chamber Theater, Ara Yernjakyan - a member of the Yerevan Council of Elders - arrived to meet the protesters. The situation got tense, yet a normal dialogue was initiated.

Yernjakyan argued that all the buildings in the park were temporary, the protesters countered by showing the latter were of concrete and bricks while temporary buildings could not be fixed to the ground and/or be made of those materials. They also pointed how a boutique was erected around a tree with a hole made on the roof for the top of the tree.

Heritage Party MP Anahit Bakhshyan, also in the park, stated that the construction was capital and not moveable and carried out by Gardening CJSC (Կենտրոն-Կանաչապատում), an organization which is to deal with lawns and trimming trees and not construction. The replied to the mayor's statement "You can apply to the court if you need", saying "By the time we apply to the court, they will have completed the construction".

Gallery

See also

Occupy articles
 99 Percent Declaration
 Law enforcement and the Occupy movement
 List of Occupy movement protest locations
 Occupy Our Homes
 Occupy Rose Parade

Other protests
 2008 Armenian presidential election protests
 Occupy Wall Street protests
 15 October 2011 global protests

Related articles
 Activism
 Empowered democracy
 Oligarchy
 Social peer-to-peer processes
 Waste management in Armenia
 List of protests in the 21st century

Related portals:

References

External links
Mashtots Park Movement websites
 #SaveMashtotsParkthe movement's English-language blog
 Civic Tribunean Armenian-language website dedicated to the Civic Tribune of Mashtots Park
 This City Belongs to Usthe website of the civic initiative

Facebook pages and groups affiliated with the movement
 #SaveMashtotsParkEnglish-language page for the movement
 Մե՛նք ենք այս քաղաքի տերը"This city belongs to us" civic initiative
 Մեր քաղաքը"Our city" civic initiative
 Քաղաքացիական ԱմբիոնCivic Tribune Facebook page
 Փրկենք Թեղուտը"Save Teghut" civic initiative

Related websites
 Organize!a coordination platform for civic initiatives in Armenia
 EcoLura website dedicated to environmental activism and awareness
 Armenian Environmental Network

2012 in Armenia
Nonviolent occupation
Nonviolent resistance movements
Occupy movement
Political movements in Armenia
Armenian democracy movements
Protests in Armenia
Yerevan